Adam Jacob Baker (September 22, 1821 – August 3, 1912) was a member of the Legislative Assembly of Ontario representing Russell from 1875 to 1883 and Reeve of Osgoode Township from 1877 to 1878.

He was born in Osnabruck Township in the County of Stormont in Upper Canada, to William and Anne Eve (née Waldorff) in 1821. He manufactured barrels in the village of Metcalfe where he was also postmaster for 20 years. He married Janet McDonnell in 1849.

He died August 3, 1912, in Killarney, Manitoba.

References

External links

The Canadian parliamentary companion and annual register, 1877, CH Mackintosh

1821 births
1912 deaths
Mayors and reeves of Osgoode Township
Progressive Conservative Party of Ontario MPPs